Luna Nera (English: Black Moon) is an Italian historical fantasy streaming television series created by Francesca Manieri, Laura Paolucci and Tiziana Triana and starring Nina Fotaras, Giorgio Belli, Gloria Carovana and Giandomenico Cupaiuolo.

The plot takes place in the 17th-century in Serra, a fictitional village near Rome, and revolves around women who are accused of being witches, who defend themselves and fight back. It is based on the trilogy of novels Le città perdute by Tiziana Triana.

Episodes

Cast
 Antonia Fotaras as Ade, a young witch with strong sensing abilities.
 Giada Gagliardi as Valente, the sick younger brother of Ade who she is left to take care of.
  as Antalia, the mother of Ade and Valente. After birthing Valente, she disguised herself as an old woman and claimed to be their grandmother, Natalia.
  as Natalia, the grandmother of Ade and Valente.
 Giorgio Belli as Pietro, a man who returns from college and becomes smitten with Ade. He doesn’t believe in sorcery and is furious about the executions committed by his witch-hunter father.
 Gloria Carovana as Cesaria, Pietro’s younger adoptive sister who aides their father in witch-hunting.
 Giandomenico Cupaiuolo as Sante, father of Pietro and Cesaria and leader of a group of witch hunters called the Benandanti, inspired by their historical counterpart.
 Astrid Meloni as Amelia, Pietro and Cesaria’s sick, bed-ridden mother.
 Adalgisa Manfrida as Persepolis, a young witch who, after an initial conflict, becomes close friends with Ade.
 Filippo Scotti as Spirto, an orphan working for Sante's household, who has a secret relationship with Persepolis.
  as Janara, a tough-as-nails witch who is comfortable with both magic and weapons, inspired by Witches of Benevento
  as Tebe, the powerful and strong-willed leader of the witches.
  as Leptis, a woman with martial training who is a confidante of the witches and Tebe's lover.
 Camille Dugay Comencini as Aquileia, a new witch adept.
 Martina Limonta as Segesta, a new witch adept.
 Giulia Alberoni as Petra, a new witch adept.
  as Marzio Oreggi. a powerful cardinal supporting the witch hunting
  as Marzio Oreggi during his youth.
 Gaetano Aronica: as padre Tosco, the local priest.
 Marilena Anniballi as Agnese, a woman who lost a child during birth and accused Natalia (who acted as midwife) of witchcraft.
 Daniele Amendola as Giambattista, Agnese's husband.
 Nathan Macchioni as Adriano.
 Aliosha Massine as Benedetto.
 Gianmarco Vettori as Nicola.

Production and release 
Filming for the series lasted 16 weeks and mostly took place in Cinecittà studios.

Netflix distributed the trailer of Luna Nera on 15 January 2020 and released the series on 31 January 2020.

References

External links
 
 

2020 Italian television series debuts
2020s Italian drama television series
Italian-language Netflix original programming
Witchcraft in television
Italian fantasy television series
Television series set in the 17th century